Shihab al-Alla is a sub-district located in Bani Matar District, Sana'a Governorate, Yemen. Shihab al-Alla had a population of 6316 according to the 2004 census.

References 

Sub-districts in Bani Matar District